Mario Merola could refer to:
Mario Merola (singer) (1934-2006), an Italian singer and actor
Mario Merola (lawyer) (1922-1987), a former Bronx District Attorney